Daniel Watts may refer to:
Daniel J. Watts, American actor
Danny Watts, racing driver
Daniel Watts, mixed martial artist opponent of Dustin Poirier